Vaugrenard is a French surname. Notable people with the surname include:

Benoît Vaugrenard (born 1982), French cyclist
Yannick Vaugrenard (born 1950), French politician

French-language surnames
Surnames of French origin